The stub-tailed antbird (Sipia berlepschi) is a species of bird in the family Thamnophilidae. It is found in Colombia and Ecuador. Its natural habitat is subtropical or tropical moist lowland forests.

The stub-tailed antbird was described by the German ornithologist Ernst Hartert in 1898 and given the binomial name Pyriglena berlepschi. The species was named to honour the German ornithologist Hans von Berlepsch. The species was later placed in the genus Myrmeciza but a molecular phylogenetic study published in 2013 found that the genus Myrmeciza, as then defined, was polyphyletic. In the resulting rearrangement to create monophyletic genera the stub-tailed antbird was moved to a resurrected genus Sipia which had been introduced by the Austrian ornithologist Carl Eduard Hellmayr in 1924.

References

stub-tailed antbird
Birds of the Tumbes-Chocó-Magdalena
stub-tailed antbird
Taxonomy articles created by Polbot